Federal Theatre may refer to:
 Federal Theatre (Austria)
 Federal Theatre (Los Angeles)
 Federal Theatre Project